Joel Souza (born June 14, 1973) is an American filmmaker.

Career
Souza was originally inspired to become a filmmaker after viewing the Indiana Jones film Raiders of the Lost Ark (1981). 

As a writer and director, Souza made his debut in 2010 with the family adventure film Hannah's Gold, starring Luke Perry. The thriller Crown Vic, which featured the life behind the wheel of a patrol car, premiered at the Tribeca Film Festival, and received mixed reviews from critics, who noted substantial similarities between Crown Vic and the 2001 film Training Day.

2021 Rust shooting incident

On October 21, 2021, Souza was injured by a discharge from a prop gun fired by actor Alec Baldwin while filming Rust. Cinematographer Halyna Hutchins died in the incident.

Personal life
Souza lives in the San Francisco Bay Area, and is married with two children.

Filmography

References

External links

1973 births
American shooting survivors
American film directors
Firearm accident victims in the United States
Living people
American screenwriters
American film producers
American people of Portuguese descent